Jon Sprunk is an American fantasy author. He grew up in central Pennsylvania and attended Lock Haven University, graduating with a B.A. in English in 1992.

Bibliography

Novels

Shadow Saga

Shadow’s Son (2010)
Shadow’s Lure (2011)
Shadow’s Master (2012)

The Book of the Black Earth

Blood and Iron (March 11, 2014)
Storm and Steel (June 2, 2015)
Blade and Bone (February 27, 2018)
Sun and Serpent (December 17, 2019)

Short Fiction in Anthologies

The Artist in Cloaked in Shadow: Dark Tales of Elves (2003)
Sign of the Cross in Dreams & Visions #34 (2005)
Office Magic in Modern Magic: Tales of Fantasy and Horror (2006)
The Farmer’s Daughter (2006)
The Wu Jen (2010)

References

External links
Official Website

American fantasy writers
American short story writers
American male novelists
Living people
Lock Haven University of Pennsylvania alumni
American male short story writers
Year of birth missing (living people)